Kaavere may refer to several places in Estonia:

Kaavere, Jõgeva County, village in Põltsamaa Parish, Jõgeva County
Kaavere, Lääne-Viru County, village in Rakke Parish, Lääne-Viru County
Kaavere, Viljandi County, village in Kolga-Jaani Parish, Viljandi County